The Feast of the Holy Translators (Surb T'argmanchats ton) is dedicated to a group of literary figures, and saints of the Armenian Apostolic Church, who founded the Armenian alphabet, translated the Bible, and started a movement of writing and translating important works into Armenian language.

The Holy Translators are:
Mesrop Mashtots
Gregory of Narek
Movses Khorenatsi
Yeghishe
David the Invincible
Nerses IV the Gracious

The translation of the Bible was finished by the Holy Translators in 425. The first words written in Armenian were the opening line of the Book of Proverbs:

The first Armenian translation of the Bible is among the world's oldest, has survived and is still used in the liturgy of the Armenian Church.

The Armenian Church remembers Holy Translators on the Feast of the Holy Translators in October. Churches of Holy Translators are established in Armenia and different diaspora communities (USA, Iran etc.).

According to Dennis Papazian, "the Holy Translators are highly revered in the Armenian church. Many of the works translated have since been lost in their Greek or Syriac original, but have been preserved in the Armenian."

References

Armenian saints
Armenian translators

Ancient translators
Groups of Christian saints